Baa, Baa, Black Sheep is an English nursery rhyme.

Baa Baa Black Sheep may refer to:

 "Baa Baa, Black Sheep" (short story), an 1888 short story by Rudyard Kipling
 Baa, Baa, Black Sheep, an opera by Michael Berkeley based on Kipling's story and The Jungle Book
 Baa Baa Black Sheep, the autobiography of Pappy Boyington
 Baa Baa Black Sheep (TV series), a 1970s television series based on the autobiography of Pappy Boyington and his squadron
 "Baa Baa Blacksheep", a song by Harry Nilsson under his pseudonyme "Bo Pete"
 Baa Baaa Black Sheep (film), a 2018 Indian film

See also
 Black Sheep (disambiguation)